Giuseppe Papadopulo (born 2 February 1948) is an Italian football manager and former player who played as a defender. He was last in charge as head coach of Torino.

Career
Papadopulo was born in Casale Marittimo, Pisa. He played for Livorno, Lazio, Brindisi, Arezzo, Salernitana and Bari, Papadopulo started his coaching career in 1984 at Cecina, a minor amateur team of Tuscany. Then, after two years as assistant coach for Casertana, he debuted at the professional level in 1987 for Sorrento. In 1989, he coached of Licata, a small Sicilian Serie B team at the time.

After two other coaching experiences for Monopoli and Perugia, Papadopulo in 1993 drove Acireale to a surprising promotion to Serie B. He then coached Avellino, Livorno, and led Fidelis Andria to another Serie B promotion.

But, after two other short times with Lucchese and Crotone, Papadopulo finally had his luckiest success for A.C. Siena (2001–2004), leading the team from the relegation zone in Serie B to its first Serie A spot ever, and even maintaining the top division the next year. Papadopulo was nicknamed il Papa (The Pope) by Siena fans during his period in the team, that he led from Serie B to survival in the Italian top division.

During the 2004–2005 season, Papadopulo was appointed as new coach of Lazio, replacing Domenico Caso; however, he left his managing position at the end of the season. On 29 January 2006, Papadopulo has been called back to Sicily in order to replace Luigi Delneri at the helm of U.S. Città di Palermo, and debuted with a surprising 3–0 win against AC Milan for a match of Italian Cup. After a series of impressive results which led Palermo off the lower places in the standings, and despite a one-year renewal signed before the end of the season, Papadopulo was dismissed from the rosanero, in order to be replaced by Francesco Guidolin.

On 28 December 2006, he became the new manager of Serie B club Lecce. In his second season with the giallorossi, Papadopulo obtained a third place in the Serie B final table, and then managed to defeat Pisa and AlbinoLeffe in the promotion playoffs, thus securing promotion to the top flight. Despite this, he left the club weeks later, after failing to reach an agreement with the club, who eventually decided to appoint Mario Beretta at his place.

On 14 April 2009, he was appointed new head coach of Bologna, after Siniša Mihajlović's dismissal.

On 20 October 2009, Papadopulo was fired as head coach of Bologna replaced by Franco Colomba.

On 9 March 2011, he was named new head coach of Serie B fallen giants Torino in place of Franco Lerda. His tenure at the helm of Torino turned out to last only a bare eleven days, marked with two defeats that convinced club chairman Urbano Cairo to remove Papadopulo from his managerial duties on 20 March and reinstate Lerda at the head coaching position.

Honours

Manager
Siena
Serie B: 2002–03

References

 

1948 births
Living people
Sportspeople from the Province of Pisa
Italian footballers
U.S. Livorno 1915 players
S.S. Arezzo players
S.S. Lazio players
U.S. Salernitana 1919 players
S.S.C. Bari players
Serie A players
Serie B players
Italian football managers
Italian people of Greek descent
S.S.D. Licata 1931 managers
A.C. Monopoli managers
A.C. Perugia Calcio managers
A.S. Acireale managers
U.S. Avellino 1912 managers
U.S. Livorno 1915 managers
S.S. Fidelis Andria 1928 managers
S.S.D. Lucchese 1905 managers
U.S. Cremonese managers
F.C. Crotone managers
A.S.D. Sorrento managers
A.C.N. Siena 1904 managers
S.S. Lazio managers
Palermo F.C. managers
U.S. Lecce managers
Bologna F.C. 1909 managers
Torino F.C. managers
Serie A managers
Association football defenders
Footballers from Tuscany